The Investiture of the Archangel Michael (alternatively, the Book of the Investiture of the Holy Archangel Michael or the Book of the Investiture of Michael) is an apocryphal text of the New Testament. It is a Coptic-language text, purportedly written by John the Apostle, which describes the importance of Michael, an archangel, in Christianity, as well as the role of Satan in several biblical events.

Background 
In most of Christianity, Michael, an archangel, is of fairly little importance. In the Christianity of Egypt, particularly of Coptic-language writings, he is relatively more important, and he appears in several texts.

Description and contents 
The Investiture of the Archangel Michael is a Coptic-language apocryphal writing; while it is unknown when it was first written, there are manuscripts and translations into the Sahidic and Fayumic dialects from the ninth century, though there are earlier (seventh-century, as in the case of John of Parallos's Contra Libros Haereticorum) attestations of its existence. The most complete manuscript of the text is dated between 892 and 893, and it includes the Investiture of Gabriel the Archangel. It has also been attested to in Old Nubian and Greek, and an original Greek edition of the text may date to before 600.

In two of the three main manuscripts of the text, John the Apostle is the purported writer. It describes the fall of Satan and his replacement by Michael; the creation of the seven archangels (including Satan, known as Saklataboth) and their purposes (to worship God); Satan causing the beheading of John the Baptist; John the Baptist's age at death, varying between 31 and 34 between manuscripts; and the theological importance of reverence for Michael.

Though there are several similarities between the Investiture of the Archangel Michael and the Coptic Apocalypse of Paul, particularly a shared cosmological belief system and shared physical description of hell, their theological understandings of heaven and hell are dissimilar.

Notes and references

Notes

Citations

Works cited

 
 
 

Coptic literature
Christian apocalyptic writings
Pseudepigraphy